Blowing Rock is an unincorporated community in Dickenson County, Virginia, in the United States.

History
Blowing Rock was named from a rock which will blow debris in windy conditions.

References

Unincorporated communities in Dickenson County, Virginia
Unincorporated communities in Virginia